Apostatic may refer to:
Apostatic selection, the selection by predators consuming abundantly occurring prey types
Apostasy, the formal renunciation of one's religion